Ceili Rain is a Christian band based in Syracuse, New York that is influenced by Celtic music. It is led by Bob Halligan, Jr. and was founded in May 1995. As the group's founder, Bob Halligan, Jr. explains, in Gaelic, the word "Céili" (pronounced kay-lee) means "party", specifically one with live musicians, dancing, and general merriment for an all-ages crowd. "Coeli" is a form of the Latin word for "heaven". Rain is English, meaning downpour. Thus, according to Halligan, Ceili Rain is a "downpour of heavenly partiness."

Personnel

Current members
Bob Halligan, Jr. (May 1995–present) — lead vocals, guitar
Joe Davoli (2007–present) — violin, vocals
Raymond Arias (1997–present) — guitar, vocals
Bill Bleistine (2003–present) — drums, percussion, vocals
Kevin de Souza (2008–present) — bass, vocals
Buddy Connolly (May 1996–present) — accordion, keyboards, vocals
Burt Mitchell (2000–present) — pipes, whistles

Former and occasional members
Matt Mason (full-time 2005–2012) — bass, vocals
Skip Cleavinger (Dec 1997-occasional) — pipes, whistles
John Dreibelbis (2005-occasional) — pipes, whistles
Tyler Duncan (2005-occasional)- pipes, whistles
Dan Meyer (entertainer) (2005-occasional) - whistles, swords
Phil Madeira (Jan 1996-May 1996) — accordion, keyboards, vocals
Tim Lauer (May 1995 - Jan 1996) — accordion, keyboards, vocals
John McGillian (occasional) — accordion, keyboards, vocals
Susie Monick (occasional) — accordion, keyboards, vocals
Gretchen Priest (?) — violin, vocals
Chris Carmichael (May 1995 - May 1996) — violin, cello
Rick Cua (1995-1997) — bass
Bob Harmon (1998-200?) — bass, vocals
Andrew Lamb (1998-2000) — bass, vocals
Lance Hoppen (1997-?) — bass, vocals
Daniel Grimsland (Sep 2002–2005) — Bass, Vocals
Paul Grimsland (?) — Guitar, Vocals
Naoise Sheridan (?) — Guitar, Vocals
Bruce Wallace (?) — Guitar, Vocals
Tony Hooper (May 1995 – 1997) — guitar, vocals
Rocky Marvel (?) — drums, percussion
Mark Hagan (?) — drums, percussion
Nick Buda (?) — drums, percussion
Lang Bliss (?) — drums, percussion
Nick Distefano (1995) — drums, percussion
John Daneluk (2003) — drums, percussion
Chris Eddy (2000) — drums, percussion
Robbie Spangnolitti (2004) — drums, percussion
Jim Hoke (May 1995) — pipes, whistles
Diane Davitch (1995) — pipes, whistles
John Brown (1995) — pipes, whistles
Diane Davitch (1995) — pipes, whistles
Hunter Lee (?-1997) — pipes, whistles
Matt Fisher (1997) — pipes, whistles
Sarah Hart (?) — pipes, whistles
Patrick Ross fiddle (2003 ?)

Discography

Albums
"Say Kay-lee" (Punch Records) — (1997)
We're Makin' A Party LIVE! — (1999) Recorded July 30, 1999 at Schouler Park, North Conway, NH directly to D.A.T. from house mixing console.
Erasers On Pencils— (2000)
No You, No Me (Cross Driven Records) — (2002)
Change In Your Pocket — (2004)
Anthology: 1995-2005 (Tag Artist Group) — (2005)
Whatever Makes You Dance  — (2006)
I Made Lemonade - (2009)
Manuka Honey - (2011)
Hymns & Hers - (2014)

Video
Anthology: 1995-2005 (DVD) (Balance Studios) — (2005)
Like A Train: 2005 (Music Video) (Music Video of the Year UCMVA Awards)— (Balance Studios)(2005)
Hallways of Always: 2006 (Music Video) (Music Video of the Year UCMVA Awards)— (Balance Studios)(2005-2006)
STOMP: 2005 (Music Video) — (Balance Studios)(2005)

External links
The official Ceili Rain Website
Ceili Rain MYSPACE

Celtic music groups
American Christian musical groups
Culture of Syracuse, New York
Musical groups established in 1995